John Alexander Leslie (born 25 October 1955) is an English former professional footballer. He is best known for his time playing for Wimbledon, where he spent eight years. By the time he left the club he was the last remaining member of the team which joined the Football League in 1977. He later played for Gillingham and Millwall.

References

1955 births
Living people
English footballers
Gillingham F.C. players
Wimbledon F.C. players
Millwall F.C. players
Charlton Athletic F.C. players
Dartford F.C. players
Grays Athletic F.C. players
Footballers from Plumstead
Association football forwards